Below is a list of the ambassadors to Angola,
China: Zhang Beisan
Cuba: Pedro Rosso Leal
Germany: Arne Freiherr von Kittlitz und Ottendorf
India: Ajjampur Rangaiah Ghanashyam
Israel: Avraham Benjamin
Italy: Cardilli Torquato
Japan:Ryōzō Myōi
Philippines:Constancio R. Vingno, Jr.
Poland: Piotr Myśliwiec
Portugal: Francisco Ribeiro Teles
Romania: Bogoroditza Alexandry
United States of America: Dan Mozena
Venezuela: Ruben Pacheco

References

 
Main|Ambassadors to
Angola